Two human polls comprised the 1969 NCAA University Division football rankings. Unlike most sports, college football's governing body, the NCAA, does not bestow a national championship, instead that title is bestowed by one or more different polling agencies. There are two main weekly polls that begin in the preseason—the AP Poll and the Coaches Poll.

Legend

AP Poll

Final Coaches Poll
The final UPI Coaches Poll was released prior to the bowl games, in early December.One coach on the 35-member board did not vote.Texas received 28 of the 34 first-place votes; Penn State received four and one each went to USC and Nebraska.

 Prior to the 1975 season, the Big Ten and Pac-8 conferences allowed only one postseason participant each, for the Rose Bowl.
 The Ivy League has prohibited its members from participating in postseason football since the league was officially formed in 1954.

References

College football rankings